is a Japanese novel series by Tetsu Yano released by Kadokawa Shoten from 1984 to 1985.

The series was adapted in 1985 into an anime film directed by Rintaro and animated by Madhouse. The screenplay was adapted by Mori Masaki, and character designs were created by Moribi Murano, who also illustrated the novel series. Takuo Noda directed the animation, and the music was composed by Ryūdō Uzaki and Eitetsu Hayashi.

The story begins during the Bakumatsu period of Japan in the last years of the Tokugawa Shogunate. It continues through the pre-Meiji period and refers to historical events such as the Boshin War, including the involvement of foreign governments, the Naval Battle of Hakodate, and the Meiji Restoration. There are also references to historical figures such as Captain Kidd, Saigō Takamori, Andō Shōzan,  Oguri Kozukenosuke (Tadamasa), Geronimo, and Mark Twain.

Plot
Jiro, a young boy of Japanese and Ainu descent, is a foundling raised by a kindly innkeeper and her daughter in the village of Sai on the Shimokita Peninsula.

One evening, a shinobi kills Jiro's adoptive mother and sister while he is away.  When he returns home, he finds their bodies and a strange dagger. The angry villagers accuse him of the murders, and rather than face a brutal crucifixion for the grave crime of parricide, Jiro escapes with the dagger. He encounters a Buddhist monk called Tenkai, who works for the Shogunate as an Oniwaban (Secret Police). Tenkai takes the boy to confront the man who supposedly killed his family and provokes him into delivering the killing blow.  To cover his tracks, Tenkai has the village set ablaze, and the villagers are slaughtered.  Tenkai takes Jiro to his temple on the island of Ezo, and has his subordinates Shingo and Sanpei train him in the ways of the Ninja. Years later, Jiro leaves to find answers to the mystery of his family and his father, Tarouza. Meanwhile, Tenkai has him followed.

Jiro comes across a group of Japanese men beating up an old Ainu man, and he quickly dispatches them.  The old man dies of his injuries, but his son Uraka takes Jiro to his home village of Shinopirika-Kotan, unaware the old man's assailants are agents of Tenkai.  At Kotan, the village elder recognizes Jiro's dagger as the Dagger of Kamui, which was originally owned by a former village chieftain. It was given to a Japanese ninja who married the chieftain's daughter, Oyaruru. Years later, Oyaruru returned to Kotan alone, but eventually left the village to live upriver by herself.

Jiro finds Oyaruru and learns she is his biological mother. She reveals that Tenkai dispatched Tarouza to the mountain Kamui Nupuri to find a rumored treasure large enough to keep the Shogunate in power. However, Tarouza broke all contact with Tenkai and married Oyaruru. When Tenkai caught up with them, he slashed the face of the infant Jiro and sent him floating downriver in their canoe. Tarouza fought Tenkai's men on the cliff above, but lost an eye to a primitive grenade and his sword arm to Hanzou, then appeared to fall to his death. Jiro comes to the horrifying realization that Tenkai had tricked him, and that the man he stabbed was his father.  During their evening meal, Jiro and Oyaruru collapse from a paralysis potion, and Oyaruru is killed with the Dagger of Kamui. Implicated in her murder, Jiro is imprisoned, but Uraka returns to help free him. Jiro finally realizes that Tenkai has been manipulating him for years into following his father's footsteps, searching for the treasure, and plans his revenge against Tenkai.

Traveling north, Jiro is befriended by the elderly Andou Shouzan and a young Ainu girl. She helps find secret instructions to find a great treasure which is hidden with the hilt of the sword of Kamui. However, Jiro is tracked down by three of Tenkai's formidable assassins, whom he defeats, but not before they kill Shouzan. The Ainu girl helps Jiro escape, but she kills herself when confronted by the following Tenkai. With the aid of the sailor Sam, Jiro books passage on Captain Drasnic's ship to the United States. Onboard, he is attacked by Oyuki, one of Tenkai's shinobi, but he defeats her. He then saves her from drowning, and they develop a strong bond. After arriving in America, Jiro, Sam, and Oyuki become separated, and Jiro travels on alone. Jiro befriends Chico, a French-born Indian woman, and shelters with her tribe. He then encounters Mark Twain on the way the Los Angeles, heading for the island of Santa Catalina, which is apparently the location of Captain Kidd's treasure.

Jiro eventually finds a small treasure on the island, but Tenkai and his shinobi have followed him there with Oyuki.  Tenkai suddenly reveals that Sanpei is a Satsuma and an associate of Tarouza, who was also Oyuki's father, making her Jiro's half sister. Oyuki angrily stabs Tenkai through the heart with the dagger, although he manages to fatally wound her before he dies. Jiro then finds the real treasure below in a hidden cavern. Later, Chico reappears and shows Jiro a similar copy of the treasure's location. She reveals her real name is Julie Rochelle, the daughter of French spies also seeking the treasure, and that her father and Tenkai killed each other. Jiro now realizes that Tenkai has been using body doubles. He returns to Japan, where he uses Captain Kidd's treasure to help fund the overthrow of the Tokugawa shogunate by the combined Satsuma-Choushuu forces.

In 1869, at the Citadel of Hakodate, the Imperial Japanese Navy and Army closed in on the last remaining Shogunate rebels. After a massive naval bombardment, Jiro wanders through the rubble and bodies, eventually encountering Tenkai. They engage in battle, during which Jiro kills Tenkai by impaling him through his cranium with the dagger. Jiro leaves Hakodate as the Imperial forces capture the city, but not before paying a silent farewell to Sanpei and his master, the samurai Saigō Takamori.

Characters

The protagonist of the story and the son of Tarōza and Oyaruru. He was raised by Tarōza's wife, Tsuyu. After an unknown assailant murdered Tsuyu and her daughter Sayuri, the villagers no longer trusted Jiro and chased him from the village. He then began studying the ways of the ninja under the tutelage of Tenkai. As he grew to adulthood, Jiro gathered pieces to the mystery of the disappearance of his father, and he began to devise a trap to snare Tenkai.

The top agent for the Bakufu (a member of the oniwabanshū), who was operating in the areas of northern Japan and Ezo controlled by the Matsumae clan. He claims to be an ordinary high priest who goes by the name of Tenkai-oshō. Through his Satsuma spy Tarōza, Tenkai learned of the mystery of Captain Kidd. After having Tarōza chased down and killed by Jiro, Tenkai began scheming to find and obtain the treasure of Captain Kidd. As he is the leader of a ninja clan, he uses many body doubles in order to avoid being killed himself. The character in the anime looks very much like Saigō Takamori; the reason for this is never explained.

A runaway ninja who is chasing after Jiro at the behest of Tenkai. She has the ability to split into four images of herself in order to confuse opponents.

An elderly man who shelters an injured Jiro. Because of his skill in understanding the English language, Shōzan deciphers Tarōza's notes and instructs Jiro to travel to America.

Andō Shōzan's Ainu caretaker. After Jiro boards a ship to travel to America, Chiomapp takes her own life in front of Tenkai.

The captain of a ship that Jiro boards to travel to America. When Jiro defends himself and a stowaway Oyuki from Drasnic's crew, Drasnic has the two ninjas kicked out of his ship upon arriving in Alaska.

Captain Drasnic's slave. Jiro buys Sam from Drasnic and makes him a freeman.

A Native American whom Jiro saves from being raped by outlaws. She learns from her adoptive father Geronimo that her real name is Julie Rochelle, and her father was François Rochelle, a French diplomat who had learned of the treasure of Captain Kidd before he was murdered by Tenkai.

An Apache chief and the adoptive father of Chico.

The famous American writer who befriends Jiro. Upon learning that Jiro is Japanese, he references Marco Polo's discovery of Zipangu.

A ninja spy hired by Tenkai to find the treasure of Captain Kidd. During his mission, he fell in love with the Ainu woman Oyaruru, who gave birth to Jiro. Tarōza was hunted down by Tenkai's ninjas, who cornered him before the high priest had Jiro stab him in the heart. With his dying breath, Tarōza revealed himself to be Jiro's father.

Jiro's Ainu mother. Upon learning of Jiro's birth, Tenkai scars the infant across the nose before driving him away on a river.

Media

Novels

The Kadokawa bunkoban releases are as follows:
Volume 1, February 1984, 
Volume 2, February 1984, 
Volume 3, December 1984, 
Volume 4, January 1985, 
Volume 5, February 1985, 

The Haruki bunkoban release is as follows:
Volume 1, February 1999,

Video game
A video game was released for the NEC PC-88 in 1985.

American release
On October 2, 1987, an American home video company known as Celebrity Home Entertainment released The Dagger of Kamui on their Just for Kids VHS label in an English-dubbed version called Revenge of the Ninja Warrior. This release of the film was heavily edited, removing 22 of the 132 minutes of footage; the resulting cut ran 110 minutes. The uncut dub was later re-released by Best Film and Video Co. in 1995 under the title The Blade of Kamui.

The unedited version, in Japanese with English subtitles and bearing the title The Dagger of Kamui, was later released on VHS and DVD by AnimEigo.

Musical score
Ryudo Uzaki's score for the film is notable for combining rock music instrumentation with Balinese kecak vocals.

Reception 
Helen McCarthy in 500 Essential Anime Movies states that "with Madhouse and a stellar team of animators on board, the art and design are first class". She praises the "clever script", fluid animation and battle scenes, calling the film "a good old-fashioned epic".

References

External links
 (Madhouse)

1984 Japanese novels
1985 anime films
Action anime and manga
Adventure anime and manga
Ainu in fiction
Animated films about orphans
Anime and manga set in Hokkaido
Coming-of-age anime and manga
Cultural depictions of Mark Twain
Cultural depictions of William Kidd
Japanese films about revenge
Films directed by Rintaro
Films set in feudal Japan
Films set in Alaska
Films set in California
Films set on islands
1980s Japanese-language films
Kadokawa Dwango franchises
Madhouse (company)
Ninja in anime and manga
Ninja films
Novel series
Novels set in Japan
Treasure hunt films

fr:L'Épée de Kamui
it:La spada dei Kamui
ja:カムイの剣
zh:卡姆伊之劍